This is a list of organisations with a British royal charter. It includes organisations in the United Kingdom and elsewhere, in chronological order, that have received a royal charter from an English, Scottish, or British monarch.

The list of organisations in the United Kingdom with a royal charter is an alphabetical list of organisations in the UK.

Table

Kingdom of England

13th and 14th century
see table above.

15th century
4 December 1416	Cutlers' Company
16 February 1428	Grocers' Company
22 February 1437	Brewers' Company
23 August 1437	Vintners' Company
26 April 1439	Cordwainers' Company
       1441 King's College, Cambridge
	1444	Leathersellers' Company
8 May 1453	Armourers' and Brasiers' Company
13 October 1457	Magdalen College, Oxford
8 March 1462	Tallow Chandlers' Company
	1462	Barbers' Company
20 March 1463	Ironmongers' Company
16 February 1471	Dyers' Company
20 January 1473	Pewterers' Company
	1474	Corporation of Blacksmith's of Dublin
16 August 1475	St. Catharine's College, Cambridge
7 July 1477	Carpenters' Company
16 February 1483	Wax Chandlers' Company
	1496	Jesus College, Cambridge

16th century

1500-1549
10 March 1501	Plaisterers' Company
29 April 1501	Coopers' Company
23 February 1504	Poulters' Company
1 July 1505 Royal College of Surgeons of Edinburgh
2 July 1509	Bakers' Company
9 April 1511 St John's College, Cambridge
15 January 1512	Brasenose College, Oxford
       1513 Nottingham High School
	1517	Corpus Christi College, Oxford
23 September 1518	Royal College of Physicians of London
18 January 1528	Clothworkers' Company
	1532	Bristol Grammar School
25 August 1537	Honourable Artillery Company
	1539	Colchester Royal Grammar School (granted a second charter by Elizabeth I, see below)
	1541	King's School, Ely
	1542	Magdalene College, Cambridge
23 July 1545	King Henry VIII School, Coventry
	1545	Warwick School
	1547	Trinity College, Cambridge
	1547	Norwich School
13 January 1547	Bethlem Hospital
13 January 1547	Saint Bartholomew's Hospital
	1549	Pembroke College, Cambridge

1550-1599
13 May 1550	Sherborne School
	1550	French Protestant Church of London
14 May 1552	Sedbergh School
17 June 1552	King Edward VI Grammar School, Stourbridge
12 July 1552	King Edward's School, Bath
18 December 1552	Society of Merchant Venturers of Bristol
	1552	Bedford School
	1552	King Edward's School, Birmingham
	1552	The King's School, Macclesfield
26 May 1553	Giggleswick School
26 June 1553	Bridewell Hospital
26 June 1553	Christ's Hospital
	1553	King Edward VI Grammar School, Southampton
	1553	Tonbridge School
6 January 1554 Boston Grammar School, Lincolnshire
       1554 Clitheroe Royal Grammar School
	1554	Queen Mary's Grammar School, Walsall
15 July 1555	College of Arms
	1555	St. John's College, Oxford
7 July 1556	Charity of the Priest and Poor of Ginge Petre in the County of Essex
4 May 1557	Stationers' Company
5 July 1558	Brentwood School
21 May 1560	Dean and Chapter of the Collegiate Church of St Peter, Westminster
28 February 1561	Royal Grammar School Worcester
	1561	Kingston Grammar School, Kingston upon Thames
25 October 1561	Broderers' Company
	1562	St. Olave's and St. Saviour's Grammar School
15 June 1563	Queen Elizabeth Grammar School, Darlington
	1565	Exeter College, Oxford
	1565	Highgate School
	1567	Queen Elizabeth's Grammar School, Blackburn
3 August 1568	Tylers' and Bricklayers' Company
12 October 1568	Girdlers' Company
14 April 1570	Joiners' Company
	1571	Blacksmiths' Company
	1571	Harrow School
27 June 1571	Jesus College, Oxford
9 February 1573	University College, Oxford
	1574	Cranbrook School, Kent
	1576	Sutton Valence School
19 June 1578	Haberdashers' Company
19 July 1581	Painter-Stainers' Company
	1584	Colchester Royal Grammar School
	1584	Uppingham School
	1585	Queen's College, Oxford
	1591	Queen Elizabeth Grammar School, Wakefield
       1592 Queen Elizabeth's Hospital, Bristol
	1594	Sidney Sussex College, Cambridge
3 May 1597	Hospital of St. John the Evangelist and St. Anne in Oakham

17th century

1600s
22 March 1600	Royal Grammar School, Newcastle
	1603	Oriel College, Oxford
	1603	Hostmen Company of Freemen of Newcastle upon Tyne
30 August 1603	Fishmongers' Company
17 December 1603	Bishop Auckland Grammar School
2 August 1604	Feltmakers' Company
16 September 1605	Butchers' Company
18 September 1605	Gardeners' Company
9 January 1606	Fruiterers' Company
19 January 1606	Drapers Company
30 April 1606	Curriers' Company
30 April 1607 Prince Henry's Grammar School, Otley
15 May 1607	Salters' Company
24 November 1609 King James School, Almondbury

1610s
12 April 1611	Plumbers' Company
22 June 1611	Sutton's Hospital in Charterhouse
20 December 1611	Wadham College, Oxford
13 September 1612	Don Baudains (Jersey)
	1613	Honourable Irish Society
18 September 1614	Founders' Company
	1615	Wilson's Grammar School
28 January 1617	Scriveners' Company
6 December 1617	Society of Apothecaries of London
21 June 1619	Dulwich College

1620s
	1621	Bowyers' Company
	1624	Pembroke College, Oxford
14 June 1626	Upholders' Company
22 October 1628	Playing Card Makers' Company
16 May 1629	Spectacle Makers' Company

1630s
3 July 1630	Sion College
8 July 1631	Sackville College, East Grinstead
22 August 1631	Clockmakers' Company
14 March 1637	Gunmakers' Company
12 January 1638	Horners' Company
9 August 1638	Distillers' Company
6 November 1638	Glaziers' Company
10 September 1639	The Company of Glovers of the City of London
27 February 1639	Worshipful Company of Parish Clerks

1650s
10 November 1656	Needlemakers' Company
13 June 1657	Framework Knitters' Company

1660s
28 November 1661	Glass Sellers' Company
7 February 1662	New England Company
15 July 1662	Royal Society
	1662	Bradford Grammar School
16 February 1663	Cooks' Company
21 December 1663	Innholders' Company
30 June 1664	Royal Scottish Corporation
18 May 1666	Broadweavers and Clothiers Company of Coventry

1670s
3 February 1670	Wheelwrights' Company
2 May 1670	Hudson's Bay Company
2 August 1670	Pattenmakers' Company
29 December 1670	Tin Plate Workers' Company
18 November 1672	Trinity House in Kingston-upon-Hull
17 January 1674	Farriers' Company
31 May 1677	Coachmakers' Company
17 December 1677	Masons' Company
1 July 1678	Corporation of the Sons of the Clergy

1680s
19 October 1681	Company of Merchants of the City of Edinburgh
8 July 1685	Corporation of the Trinity House of Deptford Strond

1690s
8 February 1693	The College of William & Mary
16 June 1693	Gold and Silver Wyre Drawers' Company
27 July 1694	Bank of England
25 October 1694 The Royal Hospital, Greenwich

18th century

1700s
16 June 1701	Society for the Propagation of the Gospel in Foreign Parts
19 April 1706	Grey Coat Hospital in Tothill Fields of the Foundation of Queen Anne

Kingdom of Scotland

16th century
 1582 University of Edinburgh

Kingdom of Great Britain

18th century

1700s

15 July 1704	Bermondsey tanners Surrey/ Greater London

1710s
23 May 1711	Blanket Weavers in Witney, Oxfordshire
3 December 1711	Loriners' Company
29 July 1714	Worcester College, Oxford
24 July 1718	French Protestant Hospital
27 July 1719	Music Society for Carrying on Operas and other entertainments

1720s
22 June 1720	London Assurance Corporation
22 June 1720	Royal Exchange Assurance
1727 The Royal Bank of Scotland
31 July 1729	Queen Elizabeth Grammar School, Halifax

1730s
17 October 1739	Foundling Hospital

1740s
28 April 1741	Charity for the Relief of the Widows and Children of the Clergy of Norwich and Norfolk
13 April 1742	Charity for the Relief of the Widows and Children of the Clergy of Suffolk
5 July 11 October	British Linen Bank
29 April 1747	Governors of the Charity for the relief of the poor Widows and Orphans of Beneficed Clergymen or having Curacys in the County of Essex the Deanery of Braughing and Archdeaconry of St. Albans, County of Hertford and Diocese of London

1750s
2 November 1751	Society of Antiquaries of London
9 December 1758	London Hospital

1760s
8 June 1765	Bethel Hospital, Norwich

1770s
19 June 1773	Carron Company
	1773	Royal Medical Society
27 January 1774	Society of Advocates in Aberdeen

1780s
24 March 1781	Governors of the possessions etc. of the Free Chapel of Hindon within the parish of East Knoyle, Wiltshire
29 March 1783	Royal Society of Edinburgh
6 May 1783	Society of Antiquaries of Scotland
9 June 1783	Glasgow Chamber of Commerce and Manufactures
10 July 1786	Edinburgh Chamber of Commerce and Manufactures
17 May 1787	Royal Highland and Agricultural Society of Scotland

1790s
26 August 1790	Royal Society of Musicians of Great Britain
21 December 1791	Glasgow Royal Infirmary
9 January 1792	Society for the Benefit of Sons and Daughters of the Clergy of the Church of Scotland
30 October 1794	Christian Faith Society
6 June 1796	Royal Faculty of Procurators in Glasgow
24 January 1797	Society of Solicitors in the Supreme Courts of Scotland
28 June 1798	Ayr Academy

19th century

1800s
13 January 1800	Royal Institution of Great Britain
22 March 1800	Royal College of Surgeons of England
22 September 1800	Downing College, Cambridge

United Kingdom

19th century

1800s
19 April 1801	James Gillespie's Hospital and Free School
26 March 1802	Linnean Society of London
12 May 1802	University of King's College, Halifax, Nova Scotia
7 April 1807	Dumfries and Galloway Royal Infirmary
17 April 1809	Royal Horticultural Society

1810s
23 May 1817	National Society for Promoting the Education of the Poor in the Principles of the Established Church throughout England and Wales
13 January 1818	Royal Edinburgh Public Dispensary
19 May 1818	Royal Literary Fund
8 May 1819	Dundee Royal Infirmary

1820s
	1820	Faculty of Procurators and Solicitors in Dundee
31 March 1821	McGill University, Montreal
6 February 1824	Edinburgh Academy
11 August 1824	Royal Asiatic Society
14 October 1824	Royal Caledonian Horticultural Society
1 November 1824	Australian Agricultural Company
9 December 1824	Glasgow Royal Mental Hospital
23 April 1825	Geological Society of London
15 September 1825	Royal Society of Literature of the United Kingdom
10 November 1825	Van Diemen's Land Company
28 June 1826	University Life Assurance Society
19 August 1826 Canada Company
15 March 1827	University of Toronto
2 August 1827	Society for the management and distribution of the Artists Fund
6 February 1828	St David's College, Lampeter
3 June 1828	Institution of Civil Engineers
27 March 1829	Zoological Society of London
14 August 1829	King's College London

1830s
18 January 1830	General Lying-in Hospital
23 June 1830	Royal Academy of Music
7 March 1831	Royal Astronomical Society
6 August 1832	Cambridge Philosophical Society
20 March 1834 British American Land Company
30 September 1834	Royal Medical and Chirurgical Society of London
3 May 1836	Society of Licensed Victuallers
28 November 1836	University of London
11 January 1837	Royal Institute of British Architects
1 June 1837	University of Durham
7 June 1837	Company of Stationers of Glasgow
26 April 1838	Royal Naval Benevolent Society
13 August 1838	Royal Scottish Academy of Painting, Sculpture & Architecture
26 August 1839	Mauritius Commercial Bank

1840s
26 March 1840	Royal Agricultural Society of England
29 January 1840	Pacific Steam Navigation Company
1 August 1840	Society of Solicitors of Banffshire
10 November 1840	Peninsular and Oriental Steam Navigation Company
16 March 1841	Bank of Australasia
16 October 1841	Queen's University at Kingston, Ontario
16 March 1842	McLachlan's Free School
30 June 1842	Artists General Benevolent Institution
15 December 1842	Licensed Victuallers Asylum
18 February 1843	Pharmaceutical Society of Great Britain
3 April 1843	Royal Grammar School Worcester
27 April 1843	Queen Elizabeth's Almshouses Worcester
18 January 1844	Ionian Bank
8 March 1844	Royal College of Veterinary Surgeons
26 February 1845	The Law Society
21 August 1845	Marlborough College
13 January 1845	Trust and Loan Company of Upper Canada
30 June 1845	Metropolitan Association for Improving the Dwellings of the Industrious Classes
	1845	Queen's College of Belfast (now Queen's University Belfast)
	1846	Royal Bermuda Yacht Club
3 February 1847	Royal Society of British Artists
20 May 1847	Society for the Encouragement of Arts, Manufactures, and Commerce. (Royal Society of Arts)
17 July 1847 Eastern Archipelago Company
8 May 1848	Governesses Benevolent Institution
27 June 1848	Missionary College of Saint Augustine Canterbury
4 September 1848	Chemical Society
16 December 1848	College of Preceptors
1 March 1849	Warneford Lunatic Asylum (Oxford)
30 July 1849	Royal British Bank

1850s
14 August 1850	Commissioners for the Exhibition of 1851
12 December 1850	Royal College of Surgeons of Edinburgh
5 May 1851	Educational Institute of Scotland
23 October 1851	Falkland Islands Company
23 October 1851	Leith Chamber of Commerce
16 July 1852	University of Trinity College, Toronto
8 December 1852	Université Laval, Quebec
5 April 1852	General Theatrical Fund Association
28 January 1853	Bishops University, Lennoxville, Quebec
13 December 1853	Wellington College
13 June 1853	Council and Committee of Queen's College
19 August 1853	Chartered Bank of India, Australia and China
7 April 1854	Marylebone Association for Improving the Dwellings of the Industrious Classes
7 April 1854	City of Worcester Association for Building Dwellings for the Labouring Classess
13 September 1854	Society of Accountants in Edinburgh
18 October 1854	London and Eastern Banking Corporation
7 February 1857	Society of Procurators and Solicitors in the City and Country of Perth
12 July 1857	Hospital for Women
3 February 1858	University of Sydney
11 January 1859	Royal Geographical Society
6 July 1859	Benevolent Institution for the Relief of Aged and Infirm Journeymen Tailors
23 September 1859	National Benevolent Institution, founded by the late Peter Herve
22 October 1859	High School of Dundee

1860s
23 January 1860	Royal United Service Institution
7 March 1860	Royal National Lifeboat Institution for the Preservation of Life from Shipwreck
5 August 1861	Royal College of Physicians of Edinburgh
20 November 1861	Glasgow Art Union
19 July 1862	Salisbury Infirmary
1 November 1862	Asylum for Idiots
1 November 1862	Saint Andrew's College, Bradfield
3 February 1864	Dundee Chamber of Commerce
3 February 1864	Royal Orthopaedic Hospital
3 February 1864	Society for Relief of Widows and Orphans of Medical Men
7 April 1864	Natal Native Trust
9 July 1864	Friend of the Clergy
9 July 1864	Albert Middle Class College in Suffolk
28 July 1864	Haileybury College
1 November 1864	Printers' Pension, Almshouse and Orphan Asylum Corporation
5 December 1865	Meteorological Society
9 May 1866	Corporation for Middle Class Education in the Metropolis and the Suburbs thereof
26 July 1866	Microscopical Society
28 December 1866	Corporation of the Hall of Arts and Sciences (Royal Albert Hall)
26 February 1867	Preceptor, Patrons and Directors of Baillie's Institution in Glasgow
4 November 1867	Association for the Protection of Commercial Interests as respects Wrecked and Damaged Property
30 July 1868	Crossley Orphan Home and School
14 September 1868	Faculty of Actuaries in Scotland

1870s
4 June 1870	Keble College, Oxford
6 July 1871	Incorporated Lay Body of the Church of England in Jamaica
17 March 1875	Royal Veterinary College
13 May 1875	Dundee Royal Lunatic Asylum
23 October 1876	North of England Institute of Mining and Mechanical Engineers
7 February 1877	Clifton College
11 July 1877	University of the Cape of Good Hope

1880s
18 March 1880	Victoria University (UK)
24 March 1880	Institute of Chartered Accountants in England and Wales
2 March 1881	University of Adelaide
15 July 1881	Surveyors' Institution
31 July 1881 Royal College Colombo, Sri Lanka
26 August 1881	South Wales Institute of Engineers
18 August 1882	Selwyn College, Cambridge
18 August 1882	Royal Colonial Institute
20 April 1883	Royal College of Music
23 August 1883	Charing Cross Hospital
12 December 1883	Incorporated Society of Law Agents in Scotland
26 June 1884	St. Paul's Hostel, Cambridge
29 July 1884	Institute of Actuaries
11 August 1884	University College of South Wales and Monmouthshire
29 November 1884	Radcliffe Infirmary, Oxford
30 December 1884	Royal National Hospital for Consumption and Diseases of the Chest on the separate or Cottage principle
26 March 1885	University College of North Wales
19 May 1885	Queen Charlotte's Lying in Hospital
19 May 1885	Institute of Chemistry of Great Britain and Ireland
24 June 1885	Entomological Society of London
8 March 1886	Princess Helena College
14 January 1887	Royal Statistical Society
27 November 1887Belfast Royal Academy
7 February 1888	Trustees of the Buchanan Bequest
7 February 1888	Corporation of the Church House
3 May 1888	Grand Priory of the Order of the Hospital of St. John of Jerusalem in England
5 July 1889	Royal Historical Society
23 July 1889	University College of Wales, Aberystwyth (now the University of Wales, Aberystwyth)
19 August 1889	Queen Victoria's Jubilee Institute for Nurses
19 August 1889	Imperial Bank of Persia
15 October 1889	British South Africa Company

1890s
8 February 1890	Institute of Journalists
21 October 1890	National Rifle Association
21 October 1890	Rossall School
21 October 1890	St. Peter's College, Radley
22 November 1890	Newspaper Press Fund
9 May 1891	Royal Provident Fund for Sea Fishermen
30 July 1891	Chartered Institute of Patent Agents (now the Chartered Institute of Patent Attorneys)
5 August 1892	Governors of the Buchanan Retreat
16 May 1893	Royal British Nurses' Association
23 November 1893	University of Wales
23 November 1893	Royal College of Organists
	1894	West London Hospital
11 May 1895	National Society for the Prevention of Cruelty to Children
26 November 1897	Queen Victoria Clergy Fund
17 February 1898	Library Association
19 May 1898	Corporation of the Cranleigh and Bramley Schools
19 May 1898	Victorian Order of Nurses for Canada
9 August 1898	Royal Blind Asylum and School, Edinburgh
7 March 1899	St. Andrew's Ambulance Association
14 July 1899	Grand Antiquity Society of Glasgow
7 October 1899	British Home and Hospital for Incurables

20th century

1900s
3 March 1900	University of Birmingham
17 September 1900	City and Guilds of London Institute
17 September 1900	Great Northern Central Hospital
27 March 1901 Royal Philosophical Society of Glasgow
26 July 1902	British Academy for the Promotion of Historical, Philosophical and Philological Studies
21 August 1902	Carnegie Trust for the Universities of Scotland (revised 1978)
15 September 1902	Weavers Society of Anderston
20 October 1902	Chartered Institute of Secretaries of Joint Stock Companies and other Public Bodies
19 November 1902	Royal Economic Society
16 February 1903	Royal Edinburgh Hospital for Incurables
16 February 1903	Royal Society for Home Relief to Incurables, Edinburgh
9 July 1903	Victoria University of Manchester
9 July 1903	University of Liverpool
9 July 1903	Chartered Society of Queen Square
10 August 1903	University College of Nottingham
11 February 1904	Royal Numismatic Society
21 April 1904	University of Leeds
15 July 1904	West India Committee
10 August 1904	British Cotton Growing Association
24 October 1904	Royal Society for the Protection of Birds
29 May 1905	University of Sheffield
11 July 1905	Royal National Orthopaedic Hospital
11 May 1906	British and Foreign School Society
30 June 1906	Institute of Directors
1 December 1906	Hull Royal Infirmary
11 February 1907	Royal Warrant Holders Association
1 March 1907	National Museum of Wales
1 March 1907	National Library of Wales
1 June 1907	Society of Chemical Industry
6 July 1907	Imperial College of Science and Technology
2 November 1907	Royal Society of South Africa
21 December 1908	Bedford College for Women
1 August 1908	British Red Cross Society
17 May 1909	University of Bristol
10 August 1909	Royal British Colonial Society of Artists

1910s
22 April 1910	Cancer Hospital (Free)
13 October 1910	Association of Deacons of the Fourteen Incorporated Trades of Glasgow
28 November 1910	Institution of Naval Architects
23 January 1911	Royal United Kingdom Beneficent Association
25 May 1911	Royal Society of Painter-Etchers and Engravers
16 December 1911	Scout Association
17 January 1912	Chartered Insurance Institute
14 May 1912	King Edward the Seventh Welsh National Memorial Association
14 June 1912	British School at Rome
16 December 1912	King Edward VII Sanatorium
11 February 1913	Paton Trust
24 June 1913	Zoological Society of Scotland
7 October 1913 Royal West of England Academy
14 October 1913	Royal Asylum of Montrose
14 October 1913	Montrose Royal Infirmary
30 March 1914	Liverpool Merchants Guild
7 January 1915	Institution of Mining Engineers
7 January 1915	Institution of Mining and Metallurgy
2 June 1915	University of Tasmania
23 May 1916	School of Oriental Studies, London Institution
7 September 1916	Society for the Promotion of Nature Reserves
30 March 1917	Newnham College, Cambridge
10 May 1917	Imperial War Graves Commission (now Commonwealth War Graves Commission)
19 May 1917	Carnegie United Kingdom Trust
27 November 1917	Queen Mary's Hospital for the East End
14 January 1919	Carnegie Dunfermline and Hero Fund Trustees
24 February 1919	Incorporation of Cordiners in Glasgow
15 April 1919	Representative Body of the Church in Wales
30 May 1919	Royal Hospital and Home for Incurables, Putney
9 December 1919	Institute of Chartered Shipbrokers
9 December 1919	University College of Swansea (now Swansea University)
20 December 1919	King George's Fund for Sailors
20 December 1919	Lord Kitchener National Memorial Fund

1920s
11 March 1920	Leicester Royal Infirmary
25 March 1920	Medical Research Council
25 March 1920	Forestry Commissioners
17 May 1920	Chamber of Shipping of the United Kingdom
17 May 1920	Chartered Society of Massage and Medical Gymnastics
28 June 1920	Royal Academy of Dramatic Art
13 October 1920	St. Mary's Hospital, Paddington
10 June 1921	Officers' Association
14 July 1921	Medical College of St. Bartholomew's Hospital in the City of London
10 August 1921	Institution of Electrical Engineers
11 October 1921	Empire Forestry Association
11 October 1921	Empire Cotton Growing Corporation
7 November 1921	Institute of British Foundrymen
13 December 1921	Royal Liverpool Seamen's Orphan Institution
6 February 1922	Royal Scottish Society for Prevention of Cruelty to Children
3 March 1922	Royal Victoria College, Montreal
3 March 1922	Over-Seas League
1 April 1922	Royal Naval Benevolent Trust (Grand Fleet and Kindred Funds)
5 May 1922	Incorporation of Architects in Scotland
20 June 1922	St. John's Foundation School
10 August 1922	College of Estate Management
6 December 1922	Toc H (Incorporated)
6 December 1922	Girl Guides Association
29 January 1923	Institution of Royal Engineers
12 March 1923	British Institute of Florence
4 May 1923	Confederation of British Industry
4 May 1923	Wolverhampton and Staffordshire Hospital
26 June 1923	Cardiff Royal Infirmary
11 October 1923	Dover College
21 March 1924	London School of Hygiene and Tropical Medicine
25 June 1924	Royal Life Saving Society
25 July 1924	Girton College, Cambridge
6 February 1925	The Textile Institute
17 March 1925	British Legion
12 October 1925	London Playing Fields Society
12 October 1925	Shakespeare Memorial Theatre, Stratford-upon-Avon
16 December 1925	Soldiers', Sailors' and Airmen's Families Association
1 February 1926	University of Reading
25 February 1926	Lady Margaret Hall, Oxford
25 February 1926	St. Hilda's College, Oxford
25 February 1926	Birkbeck College
25 February 1926	Royal Medico Psychological Association
30 April 1926	Somerville College, Oxford
1 June 1926	Royal Masonic Institution for Boys
1 June 1926	The Mothers' Union
28 June 1926	Royal Institute of International Affairs
28 June 1926	St. Hugh's College, Oxford
5 November 1926	Institute of Transport
20 November 1926	British Broadcasting Corporation
14 December 1926	National Police Fund
22 March 1928	British Association for the Advancement of Science
22 March 1928	Institute of Chartered Accountants in Australia
13 July 1928	College of Nursing
14 August 1928	Royal Victoria Hospital, Dundee
20 November 1928	London Homeopathic Hospital (now the Royal London Hospital for Integrated Medicine)
20 November 1928	National Art Collection Fund
21 December 1928	Malvern College
29 January 1929	Elizabeth Garrett Anderson Hospital
1 March 1929	Howard Leopold Davis Scholarships Trust
21 March 1929	British Engineering Standards Association
10 May 1929	Indian Church Trustees
10 May 1929	Institution of Gas Engineers
5 July 1929	Institute of Hygiene
17 December 1929	King George Hospital at Ilford

1930s
20 January 1930	Royal Society for the Relief of Indigent Gentlewomen of Scotland
28 March 1930	Institution of Mechanical Engineers
28 July 1930	King Edward VII's Hospital for Officers, Sister Agnes Founder
28 July 1930	Honourable Company of Master Mariners
28 July 1930	Oundle School
28 July 1930	East Ham Memorial Hospital
18 December 1930	Welsh National School of Medicine
29 June 1931	British Postgraduate Medical School
1 October 1931	Glasgow Fishmongers Company
7 October 1931	Australian Chemical Institute
7 October 1931	Royal Seamen's Pension Fund
11 February 1932	Universities China Committee in London
15 December 1932	National Playing Fields Association
16 March 1933	Institute of Marine Engineers
25 May 1933	London Library
26 June 1933	Westfield College, London
22 March 1934	Institution of Structural Engineers
9 November 1934	Queen Mary College
20 December 1934	City of London Maternity Hospital
21 February 1935	Cheltenham Ladies' College
6 June 1935	Royal Agricultural Benevolent Institution
13 August 1935	Institution of Engineers (India)
20 December 1935	Royal Academy of Dancing
13 April 1937	Worshipful Company of Basketmakers
29 July 1937	General Infirmary at Leeds
24 February 1938	Institution of Engineers Australia
25 November 1938	Roedean School
25 May 1939	National Association of Boy's Clubs
25 July 1939	Imperial Cancer Research Fund

1940s
19 September 1940	British Council
30 May 1941	Australian Red Cross Society
26 June 1946	King's School, Canterbury
26 June 1946	Worshipful Company of Carmen
10 July 1946	Arts Council of Great Britain
10 July 1946	Institute of Fuel
29 January 1947	Royal College of Obstetricians and Gynaecologists
10 March 1947	British Postgraduate Medical Federation
28 October 1947	Scottish National War Memorial Trustees
28 October 1947	Officers Families Fund
9 July 1948	University of Nottingham
13 September 1948	Wye College
13 September 1948	Institution of Municipal Engineers
25 October 1948	British and Foreign Bible Society
22 December 1948	Royal Aeronautical Society
22 December 1948	University College of the West Indies
4 March 1949	National Institute for the Blind
30 June 1949	University College of North Staffordshire
25 November 1949	Railway Benevolent Institution

1950s
31 March 1950	Royal Alfred Merchant Seamen's Society
25 April 1950	Women's Royal Naval Service Benevolent Trust
25 April 1950	Standards Association of Australia
9 October 1950	University College of Leicester
8 December 1950	Worshipful Company of Musicians
21 December 1950	Campbell College, Belfast
1 November 1951	Ceylon Red Cross Society
14 November 1951	Honourable Society of Cymmrodorion
24 March 1952	University of Southampton
9 April 1952	School of Pharmacy, University of London
29 April 1952	St Anne's College, Oxford
29 July 1952	Royal Masonic Institution for Girls
25 November 1952	Principal and Governors of Queen Elizabeth College
4 December 1952	Royal Air Forces Association
1 April 1953	St Antony's College, Oxford
30 April 1953	Faculty of Radiologists
20 January 1954	Australian Academy of Science
13 May 1954	University of Hull
15 July 1954	Royal Naval Association
21 December 1954	Queen Elizabeth House, Oxford
10 February 1955	University College of Rhodesia and Nyasaland
7 April 1955	Cuddesdon Theological College
7 April 1955	Seafarers Education Service
29 July 1955	Manchester College of Science and Technology
29 July 1955	Company of Farmers of the City of London
29 July 1955	Australasian Institute of Mining and Metallurgy
28 October 1955	University of Exeter
9 October 1956	Royal Ballet
15 February 1957	St. Edmund Hall, Oxford
22 February 1957	Institution of Chemical Engineers
15 March 1957	University of Leicester
17 May 1957	City of London Solicitors' Company
23 August 1957	English-Speaking Union of the Commonwealth
19 February 1958	British Institute of Radiology
14 March 1958	Nuffield College, Oxford
21 November 1958	Institute of Municipal Treasurers and Accountants
19 December 1958	Royal Humane Society
15 June 1959	Town Planning Institute
21 December 1959	Fourah Bay College - The University College of Sierra Leone

1960s
8 April 1960	National Army Museum
3 August 1960	Churchill College, Cambridge
26 October 1960	Westcott House, Cambridge
2 August 1961	University of Sussex
24 October 1961	Royal Archaeological Institute
24 October 1961	St. Peter's College, Oxford
6 December 1961	University of Keele
21 December 1961	Chartered Institute of Loss Adjusters
26 February 1962	University of the West Indies
2 October 1962	Magistrates' Association
28 November 1962	Library Association of Australia
26 March 1963	Society of Dyers and Colourists
2 May 1963	Royal Society of St. George
30 May 1963	Association of Commonwealth Universities
29 July 1963	University of York
29 July 1963	St. Catherine's College, Oxford
29 July 1963	Animal Health Trust
27 November 1963	University of East Anglia
27 November 1963	University of Basutoland, the Bechuanaland Protectorate and Swaziland
26 March 1964	Institution of Production Engineers
23 June 1964	University of Strathclyde
23 June 1964	Liverpool Medical Institution
27 July 1964	University of Lancaster
20 November 1964	University of Kent at Canterbury
20 November 1964	University of Essex
29 January 1965	University of Warwick
26 February 1965	Science Research Council
26 February 1965	British Psychological Society
4 May 1965	Natural Environment Research Council
3 August 1965	London Mathematical Society
29 October 1965	Social Science Research Council
31 January 1966	Heriot-Watt University
24 February 1966	Loughborough University of Technology
10 March 1966	University of Aston in Birmingham
6 April 1966	City University, London
9 June 1966	Brunel University
28 July 1966	University of Surrey
28 July 1966	Fitzwilliam College, Cambridge
20 September 1966	University of Bradford
20 September 1966	Bath University of Technology
10 February 1967	University of Salford
28 June 1967	University of Dundee
28 July 1967	Royal College of Art
23 August 1967	Australian Boy Scouts Association
10 October 1967	Institution of Radio and Electronic Engineers, Australia
13 November 1967	University of Stirling
13 November 1967	University of Wales Institute of Science and Technology
22 March 1968	Royal African Society
1969 Royal Hong Kong Police, reverted to Hong Kong Police after Transfer of sovereignty over Hong Kong
23 April 1969	The Open University
25 June 1969	Australian Academy of the Humanities for the Advancement of Scholarship in Language, Literature, History, Philosophy and the Fine Arts
-July	1969	Australian Institute of Building
28 November 1969	Society for Promoting Christian Knowledge
28 November 1969	Cranfield Institute of Technology
19 December 1969	Royal College of Pathologists

1970s
4 February 1970	Jockey Club (incorporating the National Hunt Committee)
4 February 1970	University of the South Pacific
28 July 1970	New University of Ulster
30 September 1970	Institute of Physics
11 March 1971	Heythrop College
22 December 1971	Chelsea College, University of London
22 December 1971	Sports Council
22 December 1971	Scottish Sports Council
22 December 1971	Sports Council for Wales
28 June 1972	New Hall, Cambridge
23 October 1972	Royal College of General Practitioners
24 October 1973	Anglo-German Foundation for the study of Industrial Society
16 October 1974	Association of Chartered Certified Accountants (ACCA)
12 February 1975	Institute of Cost and Management Accountants
12 February 1975	Institution of Metallurgists
18 March 1975	Institute of Measurement and Control
12 November 1975	College of Law
17 March 1976	Institution of Heating and Ventilating Engineers under title of "Chartered Institution of Building Services"
19 May 1976	Design Council
19 May 1976	Society of Industrial Artists and Designers
9 June 1976	Darwin College, Cambridge
15 September 1976	Institute of Bankers in Scotland
27 October 1976	Wolfson College, Cambridge
15 November 1977	University College London
25 April 1978	Carnegie Trustees for the Universities of Scotland (new)
6 February 1979	Institute of Arbitrators
14 March 1979	Building Societies Institute
14 March 1979	Institute of Biology

1980s
13 February 1980	King's College London
19 March 1980	Royal Society of Chemistry (amalgamation between Royal Institute of Chemistry and Chemical Society)
28 July 1980	Chartered Institute of Building
18 February 1981	Wolfson College, Oxford
28 October 1981	Engineering Council
10 February 1982	Institute of Foresters
11 February 1983	University of Buckingham
22 June 1983	British Film Institute
18 May 1983	Crafts Council
20 April 1984	Fellowship of Engineering
11 April 1984	Industrial Society
25 June 1984	Institute of Housing
25 June 1984	Institution of Environmental Health Officers
31 July 1984	University of Ulster
31 July 1984	British Computer Society
12 September 1984	Clare Hall, Cambridge
30 October 1984	Robinson College, Cambridge
5 June 1986	Linacre College, Oxford
8 July 1986	London Graduate School of Business Studies
10 February 1987	Institute of Bankers
10 June 1987	University of London Institute of Education
23 March 1988	College of Ophthalmologists
27 April 1988	Motability
7 February 1989	The Chartered Institute of Marketing
2 August 1989	Queen Mary and Westfield College
19 December 1989	Royal Commonwealth Society for the Blind
1 November 1989	Goldsmiths College, University of London

1990s
7 June 1990	The Institute of Mathematics and its Applications
26 June 1990	Royal Star and Garter Home
21 May 1991	The Henley Management College
11 February 1992	Royal College of Anaesthetists
15 July 1992	Chartered Institute of Purchasing & Supply
16 December 1993	Biotechnology and Biological Sciences Research Council
16 December 1993	Engineering and Physical Sciences Research Council
16 December 1993	Particle Physics and Astronomy Research Council
8 February 1994	Arts Council of England
8 February 1994	Scottish Arts Council
8 February 1994	Arts Council of Wales
15 March 1994	The Chartered Institute of Taxation
14 December 1994	Chartered Institution of Water and Environmental Management
14 December 1994	Council for the Central Laboratory of the Research Councils
11 April 1995	Mansfield College, Oxford
11 April 1995	Templeton College, Oxford
28 June 1995	The College of Optometrists
23 November 1995	Manchester College, Oxford
13 March 1996	York Borough Council
13 March 1996	Cardiff County Council (?)
26 June 1996	Sedgefield Borough Council
23 July 1996	North East Lincolnshire Borough Council
23 July 1996	Sport England
23 July 1996	UK Sport
23 July 1996	College Paediatrics and Child Health
26 June 1997	Landscape Institute
22 July 1997	Lucy Cavendish College, Cambridge
22 July 1997	Brighton and Hove Borough Council
11 February 1998	Medway Borough Council
11 February 1998	Historic Royal Palaces
22 April 1998	St Edmund's College, Cambridge
15 October 1998	North Lincolnshire Borough Council
12 October 1999	The Prince's Trust
24 November 1999	Royal Air Force Benevolent Fund

21st century
8 February 2000	Institute of Personnel and Development
12 July 2000	The Royal Environmental Health Institute of Scotland
11 April 2001	Institution of Incorporated Engineers
11 December 2001	Chartered Institute of Wastes Management
12 February 2002	Chartered Management Institute
12 February 2002	Telford and the Wrekin Borough Council
26 June 2002	Institution of Occupational Safety and Health
12 June 2003	The Science Council
15 December 2003	Thames Valley University
11 February 2004	The Worshipful Company of Engineers
11 February 2004	The Worshipful Company of Paviors
8 May 2004	Society for the Environment
27 July 2004	The Royal Photographic Society of Great Britain
13 October 2004	Association for Science Education
22 July 2005	Chartered Institute of Architectural Technologists
10 December 2007 Society for Radiological Protection
11 March 2010 Homerton College, University of Cambridge
15 May 2013 The Marine Biological Association of the United Kingdom
15 May 2013 Welsh Livery Guild
17 January 2014 The Chartered Society of Forensic Sciences
1 April 2015 Chartered Trading Standards Institute
22 March 2018 Police Roll of Honour Trust
1 December 2018 National Citizen Service

See also
 List of Canadian organizations with royal patronage
 His Majesty's Most Honourable Privy Council

References

Organisations
 
 
Charter